Your Woman is the debut album by American singer Sunshine Anderson. It was released by Soulife Recordings and Atlantic Records on April 17, 2001 in the United States. Chiefly written and produced by Mike City, the album peaked at number five on the US Billboard 200 and was certified Gold by the Recording Industry Association of America (RIAA). Your Woman features the single "Heard It All Before" and the follow-up single, "Lunch or Dinner".

Critical reception

AllMusic editor Jon Azpiri wrote that "while too many pop and R&B divas rely on Mariah Carey-like vocal histrionics, Sunshine Anderson wins over fans with her understated maturity [...] Your Woman features some solid production by Mike City and Mark Spark, and rather than trying to overpower the music with her voice, Anderson has enough confidence to just go along for the ride."

Single 
Released as the album's lead single on February 27, 2001, Heard It All Before reached the top ten on both the UK Singles Chart and the US Billboard Hot R&B/Hip-Hop Singles & Tracks chart while peaking at the number 18 on the Billboard Hot 100.

A second single, Lunch or Dinner was released in September 2001.

Track listing

Notes
  denotes co-producer

Personnel

 Kwaku Alston – photography
 Sunshine Anderson – vocals
 Richard Bates – art direction
 Mike City – backing vocals, executive producer, instruments
 Douglas Coleman – recording engineer
 Erick T. Coomes – bass
 Mikey Dan – backing vocals
 Chris Dawley – executive producer
 Timothy Deberry – backing vocals
 Larry Furgerrson – mastering
 Brian Gardner – mastering
 Lalah Hathaway – backing vocals
 Shayne Ivy – design
 Michael Linsdey – bass
 Manny Marroquin – mixing 
 Johnny Mercier – keyboards
 Mark Mitchell – recording engineer
 Jimanie Nelson – keyboards
 Mike Potivch – recording engineer
 Jesse "Biz" Stewart – recording engineer
 James "Storm" Singletary – drum programming
 Mark Sparks – executive producer, drum programming
 Erick Walls – guitar

Charts

Weekly charts

Year-end charts

Certifications

References

2001 debut albums
Sunshine Anderson albums
Atlantic Records albums